Paola Soldevila de la Pisa (born 7 December 1996) is a Spanish footballer who plays as a defender for Villarreal.

Club career
Soldevila started her career at Reus' academy. She played alongside boys at this stage of her career. Soldevila made her Primera División debut at the age of 17 while playing for Sant Gabriel.

Personal life
Soldevila's grandfather, Jaume, her father, Ramón, and her brother, Albert, have all had football careers themselves.

References

External links
Profile at La Liga

1996 births
Living people
Women's association football defenders
Spanish women's footballers
Sportspeople from the Province of Tarragona
Footballers from Catalonia
Sportswomen from Catalonia
CE Sant Gabriel players
Real Sociedad (women) players
RCD Espanyol Femenino players
Villarreal CF (women) players
Primera División (women) players